Nundubbermere is a rural locality in the Southern Downs Region, Queensland, Australia.

History 
The locality takes its name from an early pastoral run in the Stanthorpe area.

Land in Nundubbermere was open for selection on 17 April 1877;  were available.

On 15 June 1917, the Queensland Government approved the establishment of a state school at Nundubbermere. In October 1917 the government reserved  of Crown land for the school. It is unclear if the school ever opened.

References 

Southern Downs Region
Localities in Queensland